The Show Must Go Off! is a live concert DVD series produced by Kung Fu Films, an offshoot of the Kung Fu Records label run by Vandals bassist Joe Escalante, who also acts as producer for the series. The series began in 2002 and has thus far included 19 "episodes," the most recent of which was released in 2005.

The series initiated in July 2002 with the release of a live Vandals concert DVD recorded in December 2000 at their annual "Christmas Formal" concert. However, this release did not originally bear the "Show Must Go Off!" moniker. The series title came into use with the second release in the series, a performance by Mest at the House of Blues. This was later re-labeled as "Episode 2" in the series, with the Vandals Christmas DVD being re-labeled "Episode 1." The series consists mostly of punk rock and pop punk bands from various eras, including older groups that experienced their heyday in the 1980s, later groups who rose to popularity in the 1990s, and younger acts that have formed or gained popularity in recent years.

As the series has progressed its production values have improved, and numerous special features have been incorporated into the DVD releases. Episode 9, The Vandals Live at the House of Blues uses the most of such bonus features thus far, including a "Josh Freese cam" with a picture-in-picture close-up of his foot pedal, optional on-screen lyrics, and multiple band commentaries.

Episodes

Concerts